Marginal  may refer to:
 Marginal (album), the third album of the Belgian rock band Dead Man Ray, released in 2001 
 Marginal (manga)
 El Marginal, Argentine TV series
 Marginal seat or marginal constituency or marginal, in politics

See also

Economics 
 Marginalism
Marginal analysis
Marginal concepts
Marginal cost
Marginal demand
Marginal product
Marginal product of labor
Marginal propensity to consume
Marginal rate of substitution
Marginal use
Marginal utility
Marginal rate

Other
 Margin (disambiguation)
 Marginalization
 Marginal intra-industry trade, where the change in a country's exports are essentially of the same products as its change in imports 
 Marginal land, land that is of little value because of its unsuitability for growing crops and other uses
 Marginal model, in hierarchical linear modeling
 Marginal observables, in physics; see Renormalization group
 Marginal person, in sociology; see Marginalization
 Marginal plant, see Bog garden
 Marginal probability or Marginal distribution, in probability theory
 Marginal sea, commonly has two differing meanings
 Marginal seat, a constituency held with a small majority in an election
 Marginal sulcus, a portion of the cingulate sulcus of the brain 
 Marginal zone B-cell, noncirculating mature B cells that segregate anatomically into the marginal zone (MZ) of the spleen